Krute is a village in the municipality of Ulcinj, southeastern Montenegro. It is located north-east of Ulcinj town.

Name 
Krytha's name has its origin in the medieval Albanian tribe of Kryethi. It is alternatively known as Krytha e Katërkollës to differentiate by another village of the same to the north of Ulcinj, Krytha e Ulqinit.

History 
Venetian diplomat Mariano Bolizza who travelled in the area in 1614 recorded that it was a Catholic village with 30 households and 75 men-in-arms commanded by Gjur Çeka.

Demographics

According to Montenegro's 2011 census, Krute has a population of 525. Krute has slightly more men than women; there are 271 men (51.6%) and 254 women (48.4%). A significant portion of the population (439, or 83.6%) is over the age of 15.  According to Montenegro's 2011 census, the majority of residents are ethnically Albanian (91.4%) with minority groups of Montenegrins as well as people who identify as Muslim ethnically. A similar majority (91.8%) consider Albanian to be their mother tongue, with the remaining population identifying either Montenegrin (7.2%) or "other" (0.95%) as their mother tongue. Additionally, 521 (99.2%) of the residents practice Islam.

Notable people 
Basri Çapriqi, poet

References

Populated places in Ulcinj Municipality
Albanian communities in Montenegro